Zhang Tong may refer to:

Zhang Tong (diplomat), ambassador to Pakistan, Egypt and West Germany
Zhang Tong (footballer)